Caledon Ski Club is a private ski and snowboarding club in the Caledon Hills. It is located just outside the village of Belfountain, about 45 minutes northwest of Toronto, Ontario.

Services

Main Gate       
Cafeteria
Ski School Office
Ticket Office
Kids Club

West Gate 
Cafeteria
Ski Shop - Sales
Repairs
Rentals
Administrative Office
Ticket Office
Racing Office

References

External links
Caledon Ski Club

Ski areas and resorts in Ontario